Leohumicola atra is a species of fungi. It is named after the dark-brown colour of its terminal conidia cells (atra is Latin for "dark"). It was found in Crater Lake National Park, Oregon, from heated soil. This species' conidia terminal cell becomes a darker brown compared to its cogenerate species, being nearly black.

Description
Its conidiogenous hyphae are hyaline, measuring approximately 1–2.5μm wide, often found in fascicles in aerial mycelium. These are reduced to a single denticle that is 0.5–1.0μm long and 1.0–2.0μm wide. Conidia are two-celled, either solitary or distributed side by side in clusters. Its terminal cell is 4.5–5.5 by 4.0–5.5μm, being globose to subglobose, transitioning to a dark brown colour; its conidial walls are slightly thick. Aleurioconidia are sometimes found as single-celled, with a terminal cell directly attached to the hypha, and with no basal cell. Chlamydospores are sparsely produced, being intercalary, single, and the same colour as the conidial terminal cell. The vegetative mycelium often carry swollen, monilioid hyphae that are 1.5 to 2μm wide, septate, and show thickened walls.

References

Further reading
Chen, Juan, et al. "Leohumicola, a genus new to China." Mycotaxon 108.1 (2009): 337–340.
Shenoy, Belle Damodara. Multigene phylogeny of selected anamorphic ascomycetes. Diss. The University of Hong Kong (Pokfulam, Hong Kong), 2007.

External links

MycoBank

Leotiomycetes
Fungal plant pathogens and diseases